The Fish class was a ship class of three torpedo recovery vessels previously operated by Defence Maritime Services (DMS).

Design and construction
The class was ordered in 1969 as replacements for World War II-era torpedo recovery vessels.

Propulsion machinery consisted of three GM V8 diesels, which supplied  to the three propeller shafts. Each Fish-class vessel could recover up to eight torpedoes via a watertight stern gate. They were unarmed, and their sensor suite was limited to an I-band navigational radar. Nine personnel made up the crew.

All three vessels were built at Williamstown Dockyard for the Royal Australian Navy between January 1970 and April 1971.

Operational history
Originally identified only by the numbers 253–255, the vessels were named in 1983 and renumbered 801–803.

In addition to torpedo recovery, the boats were used as dive tenders and as training vessels for the Royal Australian Naval Reserve.

In 1988, the three vessels were sold to DMS.

As of 2012, only Tailor remained in service.

As of 2018, Tailor was decommissioned and put up for sale to the public effectively ending the service of this class

Ships
 , originally TRV 253.
 , originally TRV 254.
  , originally TRV 255.

Citations

References

 
Auxiliary training ship classes